André Raymond (7 August 1925 – 18 February 2011) was professor emeritus at the University of Provence. He was an expert on the history of the city in the Arab world.

Early life
André Raymond was born on 7 August 1925 in Montargis, France.

Career
Raymond was director of the French Institute for Arab Studies in Damascus, and of the Institute for Research and Study on the Arab and Islamic World, in Aix-en-Provence. At the time of his death he was professor emeritus at the University of Provence.

Raymond was an expert on the city in the Arab world about which he wrote several books. In 2002 his essays and articles on the subject were collected for a volume in the Variorum Collected Studies series titled Arab cities in the Ottoman period: Cairo, Syria and the Maghreb.

Death
Raymond died on 18 February 2011.

Selected publications
The great Arab cities in the sixteenth to eighteenth centuries: An introduction. New York University Press, 1984. (Hagop Kevorkian Series on Near Eastern Art and Civilization) 
Le Caire. 1993.
Cairo: City of history. Cairo: American University in Cairo Press. (Translator Willard Wood) 

Arab cities in the Ottoman period: Cairo, Syria and the Maghreb. Ashgate Variorum, 2002. (Variorum Collected Studies series)

References 

1925 births
2011 deaths
Academic staff of the University of Provence
20th-century French historians
Historians of the Middle East